Diploid Love is the debut solo album Brody Dalle, frontwoman of the Distillers. The digital download was released on 28 April 2014 in the United States and 29 April in Canada, followed by the CD and vinyl record set on 19 May. The lead single, "Meet the Foetus/Oh the Joy", was streamed for free on SoundCloud on 9 February before being released to iTunes on 17 February.

The album features collaborations from Garbage's Shirley Manson, The Strokes' Nick Valensi, Michael Shuman of Queens of the Stone Age and Emily Kokal of Warpaint.

Reception
Diploid Love has received mostly positive reviews, with NME rating it 7 out of 10 while Rolling Stone rated it four out five stars.

The album debuted at number 33 on the UK Albums Chart and number 7 on the US Top Heatseekers albums chart. It also debuted and peaked at number 89 on the Australian Albums Chart.

Track listing

Personnel
 Brody Dalle – lead vocals, guitars, bass, drums, fun machine, synths, bass synth, korg
 Alain Johannes – guitars, bass, piano, trumpet, mellotron, slide guitars
 Nick Valensi – guitar
 Michael Shuman – bass
 Darren Weiss – drums
 Bral – drums
 Hayden Scott – drums
 Cindy of El Mariachi Divas – horns
 Mariachi El Bronx – horns
 Jessy Greene – violins
 Tyler Parkford – piano
 Shirley Manson – backing vocals on "Meet the Foetus/Oh the Joy"
 Emily Kokal – backing vocals on "Meet the Foetus/Oh the Joy"

Charts

References

2014 debut albums
Brody Dalle albums
Albums produced by Alain Johannes